The 1953 Alexander Cup was the Canadian national major ('open' to both amateur and professional leagues) senior ice hockey championship for the 1952–53 season.

The Maritime Major Hockey League (MMHL) was the only major league eligible, as the Quebec Senior Hockey League had been suspended, so the Halifax Atlantics, who won the MMHL title, were awarded the Alexander Cup.

External links
 Hockey Canada
 MMHL Seasons at hockeydb.com

Alex